Bandipur is a hilltop settlement and a rural municipality in Tanahun District, Gandaki province of Nepal. Bandipur is primarily known for its preserved, old time cultural atmosphere. At the time of the 2011 Nepal census it had a population of total (Bandipur and Dharampani) 15,591 people living in 3,750 individual households.

Location
Bandipur is located at 27.56 N, 84.25 E and an elevation of 1030m on a mountain saddle (Mahabharat range) approximately 700m above the Marsyangdi River Valley, 143 km to the west of Kathmandu and 80km to the east of Pokhara. Since 1998 it is connected by an 8km access road from Dumre (Prithvi Highway). Until then there was only an unreliable road, in monsoon usually not accessible or only by tractors. The mountain saddle, just 200m long, is barely wide enough to accommodate the main street lined by 2 –3 storey buildings on either side. At the backsides of these houses the mountainsides steeply descend and the gardens are only accessible by stairs.

History
Bandipur was established as a funnelling point of trade by Newar traders from Bhaktapur in the Kathmandu valley after it had been conquered in 1768 by Prithvi Narayan Shah. They took advantage of its malaria free location to develop it into an important stop along the India-Tibet trade route. With them they brought their cultural heritage and architecture which basically has remained unchanged to this day.

Originally a simple Magar village in the early 19th. Century Bandipur developed into prosperous trading centre and a community with town-like features: substantial buildings, with their neoclassical façades and shuttered windows and streets paved with slabs of silverish slate.
Bandipur had its heyday in the Rana times (1846-1951), when, as a measure of its power and prestige, it was granted special permission to have its own library (still existing).

In the 1970s, trading fell into a steep decline with the construction of the Prithvi Highway. For technical reasons it was logically built in the Marsyangdi valley, leaving Bandipur isolated up on the mountain. In addition to that, as a result of its poor accessibility, Bandipur lost importance because the district headquarters of Tanahun were moved to Damauli. The tradesmen of Bandipur were forced to move down to Dumre and many even left for the Terai; Bandipur turned a semi-ghost town. The population declined considerably.

On two occasions Bandipur has witnessed some turmoil. The people were not easily and readily sidestepped by the construction of the road and fought for a different route in the planning process. In the 1970s, when the first demonstrations for democracy took place in Nepal, the people of Bandipur stormed the little garrison. Several people were killed and the soldiers fled. Again, when the district headquarters were to be moved, the people demonstrated and occupied the administration. The civil servants fled during the night. Even the king was flown in by helicopter to calm the situation. However, the decline of the little town could not be reversed.
Some relics of its wealthy past remain. Although many houses are in bad condition, the typical Newari architecture is preserved. A distinctive aspect of Bandipur's main street is a covered veranda extending along almost the entire length on the northern side. Most of the buildings still have little shops in them. The slate slabs in the main street have been destroyed by heavy vehicles, for which they were not made, but they can still be made out along the edges and in the smaller alleys. The library still exists and was carefully renovated in 2000. Another relic is a soccer-field-sized Tundikhel to the northeast of Bandipur and the villages importance as centre for schools for the surrounding villages.

Administrative division

Ward Profile 
There are 6 wards in Bandipur Rural Municipality.

Localities 
 Baspani
 Dharampani

Municipality 

A cabinet meeting held at the Prime Minister's Office, Singha Durbar on May 8, 2014, Thursday announced additional 72 municipalities, including previously-proposed 37 municipalities in line with the Local Self-governance Act 1999. With this announcement Bandipur has been upgraded as one of the municipalities of Nepal, previously it was proposed municipality. Adjoining Dharampani VDC was merged with Bandipur to upgrade it to the municipality. From June 2, 2014, Monday onward with the inauguration program Bandipur village committee, formally started functioning as Bandipur Municipality.

Education
The educational institutes in Bandipur are Bhanu Higher Secondary School established in the 1950s, only institution offering higher education till the 1980s. Notre Dame Higher Secondary School was established in 1985, by the "School Sisters of Notre Dame" a Catholic missionary organization. It is one of the best schools in Nepal with a track record of 100% First Division pass out in the Higher Secondary Board Examination since its students appeared for Board Examination(SLC). The legacy is till today. 
Bandipur has only one public graduate college "Bandipur Campus" affiliate to Tribhuvan University and offering Bachelor in Education program. Bandipur has few lower secondary schools beside above mentioned namely Dil Primary School, Ratna Rajya Middle School, Believers Academy.

Social Organizations
Bandipur hosts number of social organizations like social youth forum, public library, child club. Padma library is one of the oldest libraries in Nepal, established in Rana regime itself. Many social organizations have arisen and faded, Tindhara Youth Cultural Group (TYC-Group) is the only active youth club (social youth forum) established in 1998. Initially it was a loose forum and was registered under District Administrative Office in 2003. Founder president of TYC-Group is Mr. Firoz Kumar Shrestha succeeded by Mr. Tara Bhattarai, Mr. Ravi Shrestha, Mr. Suman Sun Shrestha, Mr. Purendra Shrestha and current president is Mr. Rajan Bhattarai.
Hoste Haise Child Development Society is another social organization working in child development and children right sector. Other social organizations to be named are Bhanu School Operation Committee, Bandipur Hospital Development Committee, Raniban Social Committee, Tindhara Development Committee.

Eco-Cultural Project
Bandipur Eco Cultural Tourism Project (BECT-Project) is the project that lift the face of Bandipur as one of the major tourist destinations of Nepal. BECT-Project had assistance of EuropeAid. This project was a part of a European Commission/Asia Urbs-funded partnership project with the two European partner cities: Municipality of Hydra, Greece Hydra (island) and Commune d Riomaggiore, Italy Riomaggiore. Its objectives were to develop and promote Bandipur as a unique tourist destination: enhance, upgrade and conserve the built and natural environment of Bandipur; and support local enterprises to revitalize economic activities, ultimately extending the length of tourists stay in Bandipur.

Demographics
At the time of the 2011 Nepal census, Bandipur Rural Municipality had a population of 20,077. Of these, 56.9% spoke Nepali, 25.0% Gurung, 10.6% Magar, 4.3% Newar, 0.8% Bhujel, 0.5% Hindi, 0.4% Bhojpuri, 0.4% Tamang, 0.2% Urdu, 0.1% Bengali, 0.1% Maithili, 0.1% Rai, 0.1% Sign language, 0.1% Tharu and 0.1% other languages as their first language.

In terms of ethnicity/caste, 28.0% were Gurung, 18.6% Magar, 10.5% Chhetri, 9.6% Hill Brahmin, 9.4% Newar, 6.5% Kami, 5.6% Sarki, 3.9% Gharti/Bhujel, 1.7% Damai/Dholi, 1.3% other Dalit, 1.2% Sanyasi/Dasnami, 0.7% Tamang, 0.6% Musalman, 0.6% Thakuri, 0.3% Kumal, 0.2% Rai, 0.2% Tharu, 0.1% Badi, 0.1% Bengali, 0.1% Chepang/Praja, 0.1% Gaine, 0.1% Ghale, 0.1% Teli, 0.1% Thakali, 0.1% Yadav and 0.4% others.

In terms of religion, 83.5% were Hindu, 12.7% Buddhist, 2.7% Christian, 0.6% Muslim and 0.4% others.

In terms of literacy, 71.8% could read and write, 2.3% could only read and 25.8% could neither read nor write.

Tourism 
Its medium elevation, excellent view of the Himalayas (Dhaulagiri, Annapurna, Manaslu, Ganesh, Langtang Himal, the Marsyangdi Valley, Mount Manakamana and Gorkha with its high perching palace), relatively easy accessibility and, of course, old Newari town flair, make Bandipur an interesting tourist site from which a few guesthouses and a hotel at the northern end of the Tundikhel try to benefit. 

It may well be that the seclusion of Bandipur saved the Newari architecture of its buildings which otherwise would have been replaced by faceless modern types found in many other towns of Nepal. The various Newari and Magar festivals, which until recently have been held for their own purposes several times a year, can be of interest to tourists too. Sorathi and Chutka dances are very popular. Due to the distance and poor accessibility of many of the home villages of pupils at Bandipur schools a number of houses have been turned into boarding houses. Many Magar and Gurung men serve as Gurkha soldiers.

Other attractions include the Bindyabashini temple and the library in the village centre, Thani Mai, Tindhara (“Three Taps” washing place at the southeastern outskirts), Raniban (Queen's Forest), the downhill trek to the Siddha Cave and a hike to Ramkot village. On Mukundeswari, the elevation at the western end of the saddle is a little shrine and one has a view of Bandipur itself.

Some villagers have picked up growing oranges, which do quite well in the climate of that area. An hour's walk to the west of Bandipur is a silk farm.

Gallery

See also
 Khadga Jatra

External links

 Bandipur Hill Station Nepal

References

Linda L Itlis, An Ethnohistorical Study of Bandipur, Vol. VIII, No.1, December 1980, CNAS, Tribhuvan University

Populated places in Tanahun District
Bazaars in Nepal
Hill stations in Nepal
Nepal municipalities established in 2014
Rural municipalities in Tanahun District
Rural municipalities of Nepal established in 2017